Claraeola is a genus of flies in the family Pipunculidae.

Species
Claraeola adventitia (Kertész, 1912)
Claraeola agnosta Kehlmaier, 2005
Claraeola alata (Kozánek, 1991)
Claraeola amica (Kozánek, 1991)
Claraeola anorhaeba (Hardy, 1968)
Claraeola bousynterga Motamedina & Skevington, 2019
Claraeola celata (Hardy, 1972)
Claraeola clavata (Becker, 1897)
Claraeola colossa (Hardy, 1972)
Claraeola conjuncta (Collin, 1949)
Claraeola crassula Shatalkin, 1981
Claraeola cyclohirta Skevington, 2002
Claraeola cypriota Kehlmaier, 2005
Claraeola discors (Hardy, 1966)
Claraeola erinys (Perkins, 1905)
Claraeola francoisi (Hardy, 1952)
Claraeola freyi (Hardy, 1972)
Claraeola gigantea (Hardy, 1972)
Claraeola gigas (Kertész, 1912)
Claraeola halterata (Meigen, 1838)
Claraeola heidiae Motamedina & Skevington, 2019
Claraeola khorshidae Motamedinia & Kehlmaier, 2017
Claraeola khuzestanensis Motamedina & Skevington, 2019
Claraeola koreana (Kozánek & Kwon, 1991)
Claraeola mantisphalliga Motamedina & Skevington, 2019
Claraeola melanostola (Becker, 1897)
Claraeola nigripennis (Hardy, 1949)
Claraeola oppleta (Collin, 1941)
Claraeola palgongsana (Kozánek, Suh & Kwon, 2003)
Claraeola parnianae Motamedinia & Kehlmaier, 2017
Claraeola perpaucisquamosa Kehlmaier, 2005
Claraeola robusta (Kozánek, Suh & Kwon, 2003)
Claraeola sicilis Skevington, 2002
Claraeola spargosis Skevington, 2002
Claraeola spinosa (Kozánek, 1991)
Claraeola suranganiensis (Kapoor & Grewal, 1985)
Claraeola thekkadiensis (Kapoor, Grewal & Sharma, 1987)
Claraeola totonigra (Hardy, 1968)
Claraeola yingka Skevington, 2002

References

Pipunculidae
Brachycera genera
Diptera of Europe
Diptera of Asia
Diptera of Africa
Diptera of Australasia